The 2009 Internazionali di Tennis di Bergamo was a professional tennis tournament played on indoor hard courts. It was part of the 2009 ATP Challenger Tour. It took place in Bergamo, Italy between 9 and 15 February 2009.

Singles main-draw entrants

Seeds

 Rankings are as of January 31, 2009.

Other entrants
The following players received wildcards into the singles main draw:
  Daniele Bracciali
  Marco Crugnola
  Filip Krajinović
  Florian Mayer

The following players received entry from the qualifying draw:
  Johan Brunström
  Pierre-Ludovic Duclos
  Giuseppe Menga
  Filip Prpic

The following player received special exempt into the main draw:
 Ruben Bemelmans
 David Marrero

Champions

Men's singles

 Lukáš Rosol def.  Benedikt Dorsch,  6–1, 4–6, 7–6(3)

Men's doubles

 Karol Beck /  Jaroslav Levinský def.  Chris Haggard /  Pavel Vízner, 7–6(6), 6–4

External links

Internazionali di Tennis di Bergamo
2009